"A Night to Remember" is a song recorded by German dance act U96, released in 1996 as the second single from their fourth album, Heaven (1996). It was a top 20 hit in Austria and Finland, and a top 30 hit in Germany. On the Eurochart Hot 100, the song reached number 66 in August 1996.

Critical reception
In Pan-European magazine Music & Medias review of the Heaven album, the track was described as "cheerful" and a potential future single.

Music video
A computer generated music video was made for the song, directed by Paul Morgans. He also directed the videos for the act's previous singles "Club Bizarre" and "Heaven".

Track listing
 12" vinyl (Remixes), Germany"A Night to Remember" (DB 600 Mix) – 7:11
"A Night to Remember" (Minuteman Mix) – 5:25
"A Night to Remember" (DB 600 Mix) – 5:49 

 CD single, Germany"A Night to Remember" (Video Edit) – 3:30
"A Night to Remember" (12" Mix) – 5:08 

 CD maxi, Europe'
"A Night to Remember" (Video Edit) – 3:30
"A Night to Remember" (12" Mix) – 5:08
"A Night to Remember" (Bass Bumpers Mix) – 7:21
"Anthem" – 3:18

Charts

References

 

1996 singles
1996 songs
English-language German songs
Song recordings produced by Alex Christensen
Songs written by Alex Christensen
U96 songs